The Daughter of the Brigadier (German: Die Tochter des Brigadiers) is a 1922 Austrian silent film directed by Friedrich Porges and starring Grit Haid, Nora Gregor and Max Devrient.

The film's sets were designed by the art director Oscar Friedrich Werndorff.

Cast
 Grit Haid
 Nora Gregor
 Max Devrient
 Hermann Romberg
 Wilhelm Schmidt
 Werner Schott
 Otto Schmöle
 Anton Dorschner

References

Bibliography
 Parish, Robert. Film Actors Guide. Scarecrow Press, 1977.

External links

1922 films
Austrian silent feature films
Films directed by Friedrich Porges
Austrian black-and-white films
Films based on works by Alexandre Dumas